Gandheralophus is an extinct genus of isectolophid perissodactyl mammal known from the Eocene of Pakistan, with two known species: G. minor and G. robustus, both described in 2012.

Discovery 
Gandheralophus minor is known from the holotype GSP−UM 6770, a partial dentary with right third premolar to third molar in situ and from many other referred materials. The holotype was collected in the Gandhera Quarry, Balochistan Province of Pakistan, from the late early Eocene (Ypresian stage) of the upper part of the upper Ghazij Formation. G. robustus is known from the holotype GSP−UM 6768, a partial jaw and from other referred materials. All specimens attributed to Gandheralophus represent partial dentaries and lower jaws, and came from the Ypresian stage of the upper part of the upper Ghazij Formation.

Etymology
Gandheralophus was first named by Pieter Missiaen and Philip D. Gingerich in 2012 and the type species is Gandheralophus minor. The generic name is derived from Gandhera, referring to Gandhera Quarry, the locality in which the genus was first reported, and Greek lophus, "crest", a common
suffix in tapiromorph names. The specific name of the type species, "minor", comes from Latin for "smaller", in reference to the small size of this species. The specific name of the second species is derived from Latin robustus, "solid", in reference to the larger size and more robust aspect of the dentition in comparison with the type species.

References

Fossil taxa described in 2012
Eocene odd-toed ungulates
Eocene mammals of Asia